Plouzané is a commune in the Finistère department of Brittany in north-western France.

History 
The shores south of Plouzané are in a strategic location for the defense of the Goulet de Brest strait and were fortified by Sébastien Le Prestre de Vauban. Defensive strongholds include Fort de Bertheaume, Fort du Mengant, and Fort du Dellec.

Population 
Inhabitants of Plouzané are called  in French.

Breton language 
In 2008, 4.09% of primary-school children attended Breton/French bilingual schools. The municipality launched a linguistic plan through Ya d'ar brezhoneg on 15 December 2008.

International relations 
Plouzané has twinning arrangements with:
  Kilrush, Ireland
  Pencoed, United Kingdom
  Stelle, Germany
  Ceccano, Italy

See also 
 Communes of the Finistère department
 Phare du Petit Minou

References

External links 

 Official website 
 
Mayors of Finistère Association 

Communes of Finistère